Julian I. Jacobs (born 1937 in Maryland) is a former judge of the United States Tax Court.

Jacobs received a B.A. from the University of Maryland in 1958 an LL.B. from the University of Maryland Law School in 1960, and an LL.M. in Taxation from Georgetown University Law Center in 1965. Admitted to Maryland Bar in 1960, he was an attorney for the Internal Revenue Service in Washington, D.C., from 1961–65, and in Buffalo, New York, in Regional Counsel's Office, from 1965-67. He entered private practice in Baltimore, Maryland, in 1967, working as an associate (1972–74) and partner (1974–84) in the law firm of Gordon, Feinblatt, Rothman, Hoffberger and Hollander. During this time, he was chairman of a commission appointed to improve the quality of the Maryland Tax Court, in 1978, and participated in various other studies and commissions convened to consider changes in Maryland tax laws. He also taught as an adjunct professor of law in the Graduate Tax Programs of the University of Baltimore School of Law (1991–93), University of San Diego School of Law (2001), and the University of Denver School of Law (2001 to present).

Jacobs was appointed by President Ronald Reagan as Judge, United States Tax Court, on March 30, 1984, for a term ending March 29, 1999. He retired on March 30, 1999, but was recalled as senior judge to perform judicial duties. On June 7, 2019, Jacobs permanently retired from judicial service.

References

Material on this page was adapted from the website of the United States Tax Court, which is published by a United States government agency, and is therefore in the public domain.

1937 births
Living people
Judges of the United States Tax Court
United States Article I federal judges appointed by Ronald Reagan
20th-century American judges
University of Maryland, College Park alumni
University of Maryland Francis King Carey School of Law alumni
Georgetown University Law Center alumni
People from Maryland